Dilli Ka Thug (The Trickster of Delhi) is a 1958 Hindi-language comedy film directed by S. D. Narang. It stars Kishore Kumar, Nutan, Madan Puri and Iftekhar. The music was by Ravi and the lyrics were by S.H. Bihari, Shailendra and Majrooh Sultanpuri.

Plot
Kishore Kumar Sharma (Kishore Kumar) gambles and tricks people to make money. On being confronted by his mother, he decides to find a job and lands one in Mumbai, where he continues wooing Asha (Nutan). Kishore's father and his friend were murdered by the notorious Anantram who now wears a mask to hide his true identity, continues manufacturing spurious medicines and also passes as Asha's uncle. The firm employing Kishore is run by Anantram and his two henchmen Sevakram and Bihari. Anantram goes to murder Kishore in the hospital, but drops his monocle, which makes inspector Dilip Singh (Iftekhar) suspicious. He manages to take Anantram's fingerprints on Sohan Lal's wallet and figures out the truth. What follows is a dramatic air-borne sequence where Anantram is beaten by Kishore and shot by Asha. Kishore manages to land the airplane after the pilots lose consciousness.

Cast
 Kishore Kumar as Kishore Kumar Sharma
 Nutan as Asha
 Madan Puri as Bihari 
 Iftekhar as Inspector Dilip Singh
 Krishnakant as Sewakram
 Pratima Devi as Mrs. Sharma
 Ratna Bhushan as Radha Sharma
 Smriti Biswas as Dancer Lily (In the song O Babu O Lala)
 Minoo Mumtaz as Dancer (In the song Kisi Ka Dil Lena Ho)
 Kumud Tripathi as Jaggu
 Ratan Gaurang as Kishore's punter
 Amar as Professor Amarnath
 Mirajkar as Subramaniam
 Brahm Bharadwaj as Prosecutor lawyer

Soundtrack
The background score and soundtrack were composed by Ravi, while the lyrics were penned by Majrooh, Shailendra and S. H. Bihari. The song "Cat Mane Billi" was later adapted as the Tamil song "B.O.Y. Boy Inna Paiyan " for Thilakam (1960).

Track listing

References

External links
 

1958 films
Indian black-and-white films
1950s Hindi-language films
1958 comedy films
Indian comedy films
Films scored by Ravi
Hindi-language comedy films
Films set in Delhi